Weetman is both a surname and a given name. Notable people with the name include:

Harry Weetman (1920–1972), English professional golfer
Weetman Harold Miller Pearson, 2nd Viscount Cowdray, DL (1882–1933), British peer and Liberal Party politician
Weetman Pearson, 1st Viscount Cowdray GCVO, PC (1856–1927), British engineer, oil industrialist, benefactor and Liberal politician

See also
Witman